Electronic transition between two orbitals of an atom that is situated in a crystal field environment. For example, dd-transitions  on a copper atom that is surrounded by an octahedron of oxygen atoms.

Crystallography